De Dolle Brouwers ("The Mad Brewers") is a Belgian brewery, based in Esen in the province of West Flanders.

The building housing the brewery is believed to date from 1835 and has a long brewing history since its inception by local doctor Louis Nevejan, having become the Costenoble brewery in approximately 1882 and remaining in that family for three generations. It was defunct when purchased by De Dolle and restored to function as a brewery in 1980.

The grounds of the brewery and tasting room are open to visitors for tours once a week, and by appointment for larger groups.

Beers
 21 	(9% ABV) Limited-edition beer with an Original Gravity of 21 degrees Plato brewed only in 1998 to celebrate the 21st anniversary of the Hotel Erasmus in Bruges.
 Arabier	(8% ABV) Particularly hoppy beer, dry-hopped with whole leaf Nugget hops grown in Poperinge.
 Boskeun	(7% ABV) Literally "rabbit of the woods", this strong blond Easter beer (Paasbier) hopped with Goldings.
 Dulle Teve	(10%) Strong golden Tripel-style ale, the name meaning literally "Mad Bitch" in American English or "Angry Bitch" in British English.
 Lichtervelds Blond (9%) Tripel-style ale.
 Oeral         (6% ABV)
 Oerbier	(9% ABV) Meaning "original beer", this was the brewery's first product. The addition of lactobacillus gives the beer a somewhat tart taste when aged. Hopped with Goldings from Poperinge.	
 Stille Nacht	(12%) Strong Christmas beer.
 Special Extra Export Stout 	(9%) Strong dark beer.

All of the De Dolle products are bottle-conditioned, and additional seasonal or special brews are also produced.

Awards and recognition
De Dolle received 4 Gold Awards in respected user ratings site RateBeer in their Best Beers of Belgium 2008 and 2 in 2009.

In 2000, De Dolle brewer and owner Kris Herteleer was awarded the biennial "Golden Hammer" award by Bruges-based brewing and cultural society 't Hamerken for his work in restoring the brewery to function and also research on local brewing history.

Gallery

References

External links
 Official website
 De Dolle Brouwers profile at BeerAdvocate
 De Dolle Brouwers profile at RateBeer
 De Dolle Brouwers   Brewery details from BeerTourism.com

Breweries of Flanders
Companies based in West Flanders
Diksmuide